, also known as , is a Christian anime television series from the early 1980s, initially produced at Tatsunoko Productions and TV Tokyo in Japan in conjunction with the Christian Broadcasting Network in the United States, and rebooted in 2011 by CBN with Asia-Pacific region animation studios along with locally based partners like Tokyo MX and Word of Life Press Ministries in Japan.

The original series chronicled the events of the Bible's Old and New Testaments in its 52-episode run. The first 26 episodes aired from October 1, 1981, to March 25, 1982, followed by a second season called  with 26 episodes from April 4, 1983, to September 26, 1983. Between both series in the first run was the companion series The Flying House. The Christian Broadcasting Network produced a computer animated reboot starting on September 1, 2011, which has had 5 seasons and 68 episodes so far. Together, they are considered to be among the most successful animated collaborative Japanese and American media franchises.

Overview

Original series
The 1st series, Superbook (Anime Oyako Gekijo), begins at the home of a young boy named Christopher "Chris" Peeper, who discovers the ancient Bible named Superbook that can speak and send him, his friend Joy (Azusa Yamato) and his clockwork toy figure named Gizmo the Crusader Robot back in time during the events of the Old and New Testaments. The 2nd series, Superbook II: In Search for Ruffles and Return to the 20th Century (Pasokon Travel Tanteidan), takes place 2 years after the 1st series, where Superbook falls onto a computer, giving anybody the ability to see into the past from Christopher's home via the monitor. Ruffles, his poodle, has managed to get lost in time, prompting Gizmo and Christopher's little brother (re-written as his cousin in the English dub), Uriah "Uri" Peeper, to search for Ruffles. While Chris and Joy keep watch and control of the computer from the present, Gizmo and Uri experience the stories from the Old Testament solely.

Reboot series
Set in the 23rd century, the kids (Chris and Joy) and the robot (Gizmo) uncover the secrets of Superbook through a mysterious portal to the past, traveling back in Biblical times from the Old Testament and New Testament eras.

Cast and characters

Original series 
  (voiced by Masako Sugaya in Japanese, Billie Lou Watt in English): The main hero of the series, who is Professor Peeper's son and Gizmo's former owner.
  (voiced by Katsue Miwa in Japanese, Sonia Owens in English): Chris's next-door neighbor and best friend.
   (voiced by Hiroshi Masuoka in Japanese, Helena van Koert and Billie Lou Watt in English): The name of 2 characters, depending on the season. In the 1st season, he is Chris's advanced toy figure who can become a real-life robot. In the 2nd season, Gizmo became a real-life sized robot built by Uri's father.
  (voiced by Runa Akiyama in Japanese, Helena van Koert in English): Chris's little brother (cousin in the English dub) and Gizmo's current owner.
  (voiced by Fumio Matsuoka in Japanese, Ray Owens in English): An archaeologist and Chris's father.
  (voiced by Kumiko Takizawa in Japanese, Sonia Owens in English): Chris's mother.
 Ruffles (Kikyomu in Japanese): Chris and Uri's pet Yorkshire Terrier.
  (voiced by Koji Totani in Japanese, Ray Owens in English): An ancient Bible that takes Chris, Joy, Gizmo and Uri back to the Old and New Testament eras.

Reboot series
 Christopher "Chris" J. Quantum (voiced by Samuel Vincent): An awesome skateboarder, video-gamer and lead guitarist in a garage band with his Valleyview Middle School buddies. He uncovers the secrets of Superbook through a mysterious portal to the past.
 Joy Pepper (voiced by Shannon Chan-Kent): Next-door neighbor, best friend and classmate of Chris at Valleyview Middle School. She is outgoing and usually a bit more adventurous than Chris. She loves soccer, is athletic and great at other sports as well.
 Gizmo (voiced by Cathy Weseluck): A robot created by Chris's dad, Professor Quantum, to protect both Chris and Joy, but they end up protecting him. He loves upgrades to make himself more useful and would rather stay in the lab than time-travel with Superbook. A really cool feature of Gizmo is that he can change his appearance as needed.
 Superbook (voiced by Colin Murdock): A device that takes Chris, Joy and Gizmo through a portal to travel back in the Old and New Testament eras during biblical times.
 Professor Crispin Quantum (voiced by Jan Rabson): A scientist and inventor who is Chris's father, Phoebe's husband and Gizmo's creator.
 Phoebe Quantum (voiced by Nicole Oliver): Chris's mother and Crispin's wife.

Episodes

Original series

Season 1 (1981–1982)

Season 2 (1983)

Reboot series (2011–present)

Season 1 (2011–2013)

Season 2 (2013–2014)

Season 3 (2015–2017)

Season 4 (2017–2019)

Season 5 (2019–2022)

Explorer (DVD release)

In 2016, Superbook began releasing DVDs which contained two previously released episodes per DVD. There are also special features on each DVD, such as how to draw a character in the Superbook artwork style, music videos, and/or informational videos explaining where the events of the stories may have taken place or how they relate to Jesus Christ.

Gizmo Go!

In 2020, Superbook began releasing DVDs about Miss Tina starting her internship at Quantum Labs and meeting four comical robots: Gizmo, Rig, Gears and Widget.

Superbook Specials

VHS/DVD releases
Superbook Series I and Series II were released on various VHS volumes by Tyndale Entertainment. The entire series was available over 26 VHS Volumes. Superbook was released for the first time on DVD late 2005 to early 2006. The three DVD volumes features 4 episodes each from Series I.

Episode 6 of the new 3D animated Superbook series was the first to be released on DVD in 2009. Episode 1 of the new Superbook series was released in November 2010 on DVD. New Superbook episodes are of CBN's Superbook DVD Club.

See also
 The Flying House
 In the Beginning: The Bible Stories

References

External links
 Official Website
 Official Website 
 
  (reboot series)

1980s animated television series
1981 anime television series debuts
1983 anime television series debuts
1981 Japanese television series debuts
1983 Japanese television series endings
2011 American television series debuts
2010s American animated television series
2020s American animated television series
1980s science fiction television series
2010s American science fiction television series
2020s American science fiction television series
American children's animated education television series
American children's animated science fiction television series
Animated television series about children
Television series set in the 23rd century
Cultural depictions of Adam and Eve
Christian animation
Christian children's television series
English-language television shows
Tatsunoko Production
Television series based on the Bible
TV Tokyo original programming
Japanese time travel television series
American time travel television series
Christianity in Japan